Postplatyptilia alexisi is a moth of the family Pterophoridae. It is known from Chile.

The wingspan is 15–18 mm. Adults are on wing in December and January.

References

alexisi
Moths described in 1991
Endemic fauna of Chile